The twentieth edition of the ATP Masters Series. The champion of each Masters event is awarded a 1,000 rankings points.

Tournaments

Results

Tournament details

Indian Wells Masters

Singles

Doubles

Miami Open

Singles

Doubles

Monte-Carlo Masters

Singles

Doubles

Italian Open

Singles

Doubles

Madrid

Singles

Doubles

Canadian Open

Singles

Doubles

Cincinnati Masters

Singles

Doubles

Shanghai Masters

Singles

Doubles

Paris Masters

Singles

Doubles

See also 
 ATP Tour Masters 1000
 2009 ATP Tour
 2009 WTA Premier Mandatory and Premier 5 tournaments
 2009 WTA Tour

References

External links 
Association of Tennis Professionals (ATP) official website

ATP World Tour Masters 1000

ATP Tour Masters 1000